Bradyrhizobium neotropicale is a bacterium from the genus of Bradyrhizobium which has been isolated from the nodules of the tree Centrolobium paraense from the Amazon rainforest in Brazil.

References

Nitrobacteraceae
Bacteria described in 2014